Spider-Man is a superhero created by Marvel Comics who debuted in the anthology comic book series issue Amazing Fantasy #15 (August 1962) during the Silver Age of Comics. After his debut, he got his own comic book entitled The Amazing Spider-Man. This comic introduced many of what would become his major supervillain adversaries. Spider-Man then became popular enough for more Spider-Man comic spinoffs (The Spectacular Spider-Man, Marvel Team-Up, Web of Spider-Man, Peter Parker: Spider-Man etc.) which introduced more recurring enemies of the web-slinger, across their various incarnations.

As with Spider-Man, most of his villains' powers originate from scientific accidents or the misuse of scientific technology. They can be classified into multiple categories, such as animal-themed villains (Doctor Octopus, Vulture, Black Cat, Lizard, Rhino, Scorpion, Jackal, Beetle, Kangaroo, Tarantula, and Puma), those with powers over the elements (Sandman, Electro, Molten Man, and Hydro-Man), horror-themed villains (the Green Goblin, the Hobgoblin, Morbius, Morlun, and the Symbiotes), crime lords (the Kingpin, Tombstone, Hammerhead, Silvermane, and Mister Negative), inventors (the Shocker, the Tinkerer, Spencer Smythe, and Alistair Smythe), and masters of trickery and illusion (the Chameleon and Mysterio). There are, however, numerous villains that don't fit into any specific category, such as Kraven the Hunter and Mephisto, the latter of whom originated as a Silver Surfer villain. The villains oftentimes form teams such as the Sinister Six to oppose the web-slinger.

Spider-Man is notable for having numerous villains that redeemed themselves and became antiheroes, such as Black Cat, the Prowler, Morbius, Kraven, and Silver Sable. Also, unlike most superheroes, Spider-Man doesn't have one particular archenemy, but rather three: the Norman Osborn version of the Green Goblin, Doctor Octopus, and the Eddie Brock version of Venom, the latter two of whom have been similarly redeemed and depicted as antiheroes.

The rogues gallery of Spider-Man has garnered positive critical acclaim and has been considered one of the greatest rogues galleries of all time.

Debuting in Spider-Man titles

The majority of supervillains depicted in Spider-Man comics first appeared in The Amazing Spider-Man, while some first appeared in spinoff comics such as The Spectacular Spider-Man and Marvel Team-Up and other titles.

The Amazing Spider-Man debuts

Most of the supervillains of Spider-Man would be introduced in The Amazing Spider-Man comic book starting with the Chameleon. The early villains would be introduced in the 1960s during the Silver Age of Comic Books, and created by Stan Lee and Steve Ditko. John Romita Sr. replaced Ditko starting with the Rhino. Gerry Conway later replaced Stan Lee and helped create new adversaries for the web-slinger and also helped pave the way for the Bronze Age of Comic Books with the death of Spider-Man's long time romantic interest, Gwen Stacy. Many collaborators would soon take over The Amazing Spider-Man title. One of the more popular examples included Todd McFarlane's Venom in the Modern Age of Comic Books.

Note: Alter ego characters who are the most high profile in the supervillain alias but have shared that alias with others are in bold. Alter egos listed having N/A use their real name as the supervillain name. All the villains are listed in the chronological order of their debut in comics. Characters of the central rogues gallery are in bold.

Central rogues gallery

Foes of lesser renown that originated in The Amazing Spider-Man

The Spectacular Spider-Man debuts
Note: In chronological order

Marvel Team-Up debuts
Note: In chronological order

Debuting in other Spider-Man titles
Note: In chronological order

Debuting outside Spider-Man titles

Other villains

Coldheart
Coldheart debuted in Spider-Man #49. Not much is known about the history of Kateri Deseronto. She is an expert martial artist and swordsman who wields Cryonic Swords that can freeze anyone in their place.

Delilah

Delilah first appeared in The Amazing Spider-Man #414 by Tom DeFalco and Mark Bagley. A highly skilled and ruthless assassin who came under the employ of the Rose during one of the many crime-boss gang wars and became his confidante as well as his chief enforcer. She is first shown wiping out an entire room of mobsters so the Rose could maintain control of part of the New York Organize Crime. Delilah came into conflict with Spider-Man for the first time when she attempted to assassinate the ex-husband of one of Rose's employers. When the Black Tarantula first involved himself in the gang war, Delilah attempted to kill his super-strong henchman El Uno but she was overwhelmed by his power. The rematch, though, was a firm win for Delilah, with El Uno's head being mailed back to the Black Tarantula.

She also had a role during the Rose's efforts to gain extra muscle and to remove Spider-Man from interfering in their operations, in the rebirth of two of Spider-Man's old foes. She was the one who threw the switch of the electric chair which gave Electro his powers back, hoping he would eliminate Spider-Man. Electro failed, and so they devised a new plan. This time, they stole the corpse of Doctor Octopus so the Hand could succeed in restoring him to life. Delilah later found herself ambushed by the Black Tarantula himself, who easily subdued her and broke her neck, inflicting fatal injuries, but before she could die, however, the Black Tarantula instantly healed her with a message of warning for the Rose.

Attempting to find help to bring down the Black Tarantula, Delilah enlisted the aid of the new costumed adventurer Ricochet (actually Spider-Man in disguise). Together they tackled two of the Black Tarantula's operatives, Roughhouse and Bloodscream. Bloodscream grabbed hold of Delilah and caused her to bleed until she passed out. She was taken by the authorities to the hospital.

Years later she appears in Loners as an assassin smuggling MGH. When Johnny Gallo (the second Ricochet) broke into a laboratory, she thought he was the one she had teamed up with, and attacked him. Despite her skills, Johnny managed to knock her out with a cunningly thrown disc.

Spidercide

Spidercide was a major antagonist in the "Maximum Clonage" story arc. He first appeared in The Spectacular Spider-Man #222 by Tom DeFalco and Sal Buscema. He is depicted as an evil foil of Spider-Man, Ben Reilly, and Kaine. Introduced as a red herring to suggest the possibility of a third individual that was the original Peter Parker, he is one of the Spider-Man clones created by Jackal, to be Jackal's enforcer and protector. However, Spidercide is actually a clone to Ben Reilly, who is a direct genetic duplicate of Spider-Man.
 
The Jackal later modified Spidercide's powers, granting him the unique ability to control his physical make-up on a molecular level; he can alter his mass, density, shape and state at will similar to the symbiotes. Despite being created to escort and protect the Jackal, Spidercide betrayed him and aligned with the Scrier. He was believed to have died after being thrown off the roof of the Daily Bugle. only to survive and return to menace Reilly shortly afterwards

Antiheroes and reformed, semi-reformed, or occasionally reformed supervillains
The following is a list of Spider-Man adversaries who, at one point or another, have been reformed or semi-reformed, either temporarily or currently, or who are no longer primarily antagonists of Spider-Man. Many of these characters are now anti-heroes and have often acted as allies of the web-slinger, while others occasionally return to villain status depending on the story arc.

Non-supervillain enemies

Group villains

Kravinoff family

|-
|style="text-align: left;"|Notes:

Archenemies
Unlike most superheroes, who have a particular villain or villainous group among their adversaries with whom they have come into conflict the most (e.g., the Joker to Batman, and Lex Luthor to Superman in DC Comics, or the Red Skull to Captain America, Doctor Doom to the Fantastic Four, and the Brotherhood of Mutants to the X-Men in Marvel Comics etc.), Spider-Man is often regarded as having three archenemies, and it can be debated as to which one is the worst:
Doctor Octopus has been described as Spider-Man's greatest enemy, and the man Peter Parker might have become if he hadn't been raised with a sense of responsibility. He is infamous for defeating him the first time in battle and for almost marrying Peter's Aunt May. He is also the core leader of the Sinister Six, and at one point adopted the "Master Planner" alias. ("If This Be My Destiny...!") Later depictions revealed him in Peter Parker's body where he was the titular character for a while, ultimately becoming an antihero; on several occasions, he and Spider-Man have even put their differences aside to become allies.
The Norman Osborn version of the Green Goblin is most commonly regarded as Spider-Man's archenemy. Unlike Doctor Octopus, who only aims to kill Spider-Man, the Goblin also targeted his loved ones and showed no remorse in killing them as long as it caused pain to Spider-Man, therefore making him not only Spider-Man's worst enemy, but also Peter Parker's. His most infamous feat is killing Spider-Man's girlfriend in what became one of the most famous Spider-Man stories of all time and helped end the Silver Age of Comic Books and begin the Bronze Age of Comic Books. While the Goblin was killed in the same story, he returned in the 1990s to plague Spider-Man once again, committing more heinous acts (such as being involved of the murder of Aunt May). He also came into conflict with other heroes, such as the Avengers. Norman is sometimes depicted as an enemy of Spider-Man even when not being the Green Goblin.
The Eddie Brock incarnation of Venom is often regarded as Spider-Man's deadliest foe, and has been described as an evil mirror version of Spider-Man in many ways. He is also among Spider-Man's most popular villains. Venom's main goal is usually to ruin Peter Parker's life and mess with his head in any way he can. Despite this, Venom is not a traditional criminal, as he is only interested in hurting Spider-Man and does not engage in criminal acts, lacking the typical supervillain desires for wealth and power. The character also has a sense of honor and justice, and later starred in his own comic book stories, where he is depicted as an antihero and has a desire to protect innocent people from harm. On several occasions, he and Spider-Man have even put their differences aside to become allies.

In other media

Reception
Reaction to Spider-Man's rogues gallery has been overwhelmingly positive with many journalists citing it as one of the greatest comic book rogues galleries of all time, with Batman's rogues gallery being its most rivaled contender. However, editors such as The Hollywood Reporters Graeme McMillan felt that only Flash's rogues gallery can compete with Spider-Man's rogues. Kyle Schmidlin of What Culture! described the superhero's rogues gallery as "one of the most colorful in comics" explaining that Batman could only be debated as having a great number of enemies as good as Spider-Man. IGN staff editors, Joshua Yehl and Jesse Schedeen, described the Spider-Man villains as "one of the most iconic and well-balanced in comics". They opined that the scope of their schemes, how cool their powers are, and how dramatically they have affected Spider-Man's life is what makes the Spider-Man villains so great. Newsarama ranked Spider-Man's rogues gallery as number one out of ten as the greatest rogues gallery of all time.

Themes
George Marston of Newsarama said that the reason he felt that Spider-Man's rogues gallery was the best was the thematic elements that the villains manifested. He explained that just like the superhero they have the same concept of science gone wrong. They are "like him, great men with great minds, great power, and great determination." But instead they fail to use their powers responsibly, symbolizing the thin line between being a hero and being a villain. Alex Wyse of Comic Book Resources felt that a good villain is supposed to challenge the ideals of the hero. For Spider-Man that idea was the famous quote "With great power comes great responsibility", where the superhero is pitted against an antithesis of the hero's motto like the concept of using superpowers for their personal gain.

Me and the Boys
A viral internet meme called "Me and the Boys", centering on images of Spider-Man foes from the 1960s Spider-Man animated series that showcases the four supervillains – the Green Goblin, Electro, Vulture and a photoshopped addition of Rhino – along with other Spider-Man foes in some variations, emerged in 2019. The meme image parodied and represented a group of friends bonding, hanging out, or engaging in various shenanigans. It originated from Reddit and, later, Twitter. It was placed as the 35th-best meme of 2019 by Thrillist.

See also
Savage Six: Antagonists of Spider-Girl and Agent Venom, similar to the Sinister Six.
The Superior Foes of Spider-Man: A comic book series starring Spider-Man villains.

Notes
The Chameleon is the first member of Spider-Man's rogues gallery in publication date. (Excluding the Burglar.) He is also well known to be related to Kraven the Hunter and Kraven to him. That revealed relationship helped evolve him as a major villain compared to his original depiction of being just a solo villain in the original issue of The Amazing Spider-Man.
Besides being most notable as a Spider-Man supervillain, he has also been depicted as a Fantastic Four antagonist in Stan Lee and Jack Kirby comics books (mostly due to being introduced as the original Frightful Four). He was also a heroic figure (as an Avengers member) until being introduced as a tragic supervillain in the Spider-Man comics once again.
The character is also known as the member of the Frightful Four battling the Fantastic Four. He is also the first major Marvel villain to be written in publication history as battling Daredevil. Even being the founder and leader of the supervillain team that oppose him, the Emissaries of Evil.
Just like Electro, he has also been a major villain of Daredevil. In the storyline "Guardian Devil" he crossed into Daredevil's territory almost pushing Daredevil to the edge (just like he if often trying to do with Spider-Man) when Mysterio believes Spider-Man is a clone at one point.
While a recurring villain to Spider-Man since his introduction, Kraven the Hunter did not stand out as a memorable supervillain until the critically acclaimed storyline, "Kraven's Last Hunt".
Not counting any other character in the mainstream Marvel Universe with that name. Only outside of the mainstream Spider-Man comics or in other media is there other Spider-Man villains (that isn't named Mac Gargan) that are antagonists of Spider-Man. Gargan is the third character to assume the Scorpion alias in comics, but he became the most notable one, and is only one to be a recurring adversary of Spider-Man.
While initially written to be a recurring villain of Spider-Man, Rhino has also come into conflict with other superheroes (especially Hulk). He is a major character in the storyline titled "Flowers for Rhino" (Spider-Man's Tangled Web), whose name is an homage to Flowers for Algernon.
Despite first appearing in Spider-Man comic books, the Kingpin is more notable of being Daredevil's archenemy. Despite this he is a major antagonist of both superheroes in the Marvel comic books just as recurringly. He also is a major recurring villain in the rest of the Marvel Universe crossing over as major antagonists to superheroes/antiheroes (such as the Punisher) in certain comic books of the many based universes of Marvel (PunisherMAX, etc.)
Morbius debuted in the storyline "The Six Arms Saga".
Miles Warren's first appearance was in The Amazing Spider-Man #31 (December 1965), but he didn't become the Jackal until much later.
Although she is listed as a supervillain, the Black Cat is more often portrayed as an antiheroine and the major femme fatale romantic interest for Spider-Man. She is struggling to decide between good and bad, and the only thing preventing her from becoming a villain is her complicated relationship with Spider-Man. Nonetheless. she has been a staple supporting Spider-Man character during her debut.
The Amazing Spider-Man #299 is the first appearance of Eddie Brock as Venom. The alien costume debuted from The Amazing Spider-Man #252 and the symbiote bonded to Spider-Man in Secret Wars #8. Venom's creators are determined by pre-alien costume by not counting the creators/designers of the alien costume, David Michelinie or Mike Zeck, or the Marvel Comics fan who originally thought of the concept for the creators.
Cletus Kasady first appeared in The Amazing Spider-Man 344. Carnage is a major character in the popular storyline "Maximum Carnage".
Despite becoming an antihero with his own comic book storylines, the Punisher was first introduced as an adversary of Spider-Man.
Harry didn't become the Green Goblin until The Amazing Spider-Man #136 (September 1974).

References

External links
 Category: Spider-Man Villains at Marvel.com
https://monarch69.in/spiderman Spider-Man Villains at Marvel Database
Best Spider-Man Villains by GamesRadar. December 16, 2021. Retrieved December 24, 2021

Enemies, List of Spider-Man
Spider-Man enemies